Lucien Henri Gendron,  (August 28, 1890 – April 5, 1959) was a Canadian politician.

Bio 
In August 1935, he was appointed Minister of Marine in the Conservative cabinet of Richard Bedford Bennett. He was defeated in the 1935 federal election in the Quebec riding of Laval—Two Mountains.

References

1890 births
1959 deaths
Conservative Party of Canada (1867–1942) candidates for the Canadian House of Commons
Members of the King's Privy Council for Canada